The International Journal of Press/Politics is a quarterly peer-reviewed academic journal covering the field of political science and journalism, especially the linkages between the news media and political processes and actors. The editor-in-chief is Cristian Vaccari (Loughborough University). It was established in 1996 and is published by SAGE Publishing.

Abstracting and indexing
The journal is abstracted and indexed in Scopus, Social Sciences Citation Index, Wilson Social Sciences Index Retrospective, ProQuest, and EBSCO. According to the Journal Citation Reports, the journal has a 2020 impact factor of 6.592, ranking it 9th out of 182 journals in the category "Political Science" and 7th out of 94 journals in the category "Communication".

See also
List of political science journals

References

External links

SAGE Publishing academic journals
English-language journals
Political science journals
Communication journals
Journalism journals
Quarterly journals
Publications established in 1966